Amazing Grace is a 2006 biographical drama film directed by Michael Apted, about the abolitionist campaign against the slave trade in the British Empire, led by William Wilberforce, who was responsible for steering anti-slave trade legislation through the British parliament. The title is a reference to the 1772 hymn "Amazing Grace". The film also recounts the experiences of John Newton as a crewman on a slave ship and subsequent religious conversion, which inspired his writing of the poem later used in the hymn. Newton is portrayed as a major influence on Wilberforce and the abolition movement.

The film premièred on 16 September 2006 at the Toronto International Film Festival, followed by showings at the Heartland Film Festival, the Santa Barbara International Film Festival, and the European Film Market, before opening in wide US release on 23 February 2007, which coincided with the 200th anniversary of the date the British parliament voted to ban the slave trade.

Plot
In 1797, William Wilberforce is severely ill and taking a recuperative holiday in Bath, Somerset, with his cousin, Henry Thornton. It is here that Wilberforce is introduced to his future wife, Barbara Spooner. Although he initially resists any romantic overtures, she convinces him to relate the story of his career.

The story flashes back 15 years to 1782, and Wilberforce recounts the events that led him to where he is now. Beginning as a young, ambitious, and popular Member of Parliament (MP), he experiences a religious enlightenment and aligns himself with the evangelical wing of the Church of England. Wilberforce contemplates leaving politics to study theology, but is persuaded by his friends William Pitt, Thomas Clarkson, Hannah More, and Olaudah Equiano that he will be more effective doing the work of God by taking on the unpopular and dangerous issue of the abolition of the British slave trade. His conviction in the cause deepens following a meeting with his former mentor John Newton (introduced mopping a church floor dressed in sackcloth) who is said to live "in the company of 20,000 ghosts… slaves". As a former slave ship captain turned Christian, he deeply regrets his past life and the effects on his fellow man. Newton urges Wilberforce to take up the cause.

Pitt becomes Prime Minister and Wilberforce becomes a key supporter and confidant. Pitt gives Wilberforce the opportunity to present a bill before the house outlawing the slave trade. Wilberforce's passionate campaigning leads him to become highly unpopular in the House of Commons. He is opposed by a coalition of MPs representing vested interests of the slave trade in London, Bristol, Glasgow, and Liverpool led by Banastre Tarleton and the Duke of Clarence. Despite popular support and the assistance of an unlikely ally in the form of Charles James Fox, Wilberforce's bill to abolish the slave trade goes down to defeat. Afterward, the film portrays Pitt as one of his few friends and allies remaining in Parliament, however even their relationship becomes strained.  Pitt, now facing the stresses of leading a shaky coalition during the French Revolutionary Wars, tells Wilberforce that his cause must now wait for a more stable political climate.

Wilberforce keeps up the fight but after years of failure he is left exhausted and frustrated that he was unable to change anything in the government. Believing his life's work has been in vain, he becomes physically ill, suffering from chronic colitis which causes him to become addicted to laudanum prescribed for the crippling pain, which brings the story back up to 1797. Having virtually given up hope, Wilberforce considers leaving politics forever. Barbara convinces him to keep fighting because there is no other person who is willing or able to do so. A few days afterward, William Wilberforce and Barbara marry. Several years pass with no further success. Wilberforce's wife and new children provide him with the support and strength needed to carry on the fight.

Finally, with a renewed hope for success Wilberforce devises a backdoor method of slowly weakening the slave trade through seemingly innocuous legislation. Aided by Thornton, Clarkson, and new ally James Stephen and cheered on by the now terminally ill Pitt, he reintroduces his bill to abolish the slave trade. In time, after the 20-year campaign and many attempts to bring legislation forward, he is eventually responsible for a bill being passed through Parliament in 1807, which abolishes the slave trade in the British Empire forever.

Cast

Production
The film was shot primarily in Hull, Yorkshire. Baker's Quay, which forms part of the Parliament Docks on the Gloucester and Sharpness Canal, was used as a backdrop against which to recreate the atmosphere of the East India Docks in London circa 1780. Shooting took place during October 2005 and involved the tall ships, Kaskelot, Earl of Pembroke, Johanna Lucretia and Phoenix. During January 2006, the scenes from The Houses of Parliament were shot at the 1743 Church within Chatham Historic Dockyard. The wedding scene was filmed at Garsington Church.

A number of outside scenes were shot at the former Greenwich Hospital, now part of the University of Greenwich and around Salisbury, Wiltshire.

Executive Producer is Jeanney Kim, with Mark Cooper as co-producer. Producers on the film are Terrence Malick (The Thin Red Line) and Ed Pressman under their Sunflower Productions banner, Patricia Heaton and David Hunt for FourBoys Films, and Ken Wales.

Music
 
 Amazing Grace (soundtrack)
 Amazing Grace (score)
The soundtrack of Christian music included the title song "Amazing Grace (My Chains Are Gone)" by Chris Tomlin. The score was named Instrumental Album of the Year at the Dove Awards of 2008.

Reception

Box office
Amazing Grace brought in a little over $4 million at the US box office over its opening weekend of 23–25 February 2007, making it the 10th-highest-grossing film for the weekend, behind such new releases as The Astronaut Farmer and The Number 23. As of 26 August 2007 the film had $32,050,774.

Critical response
Amazing Grace received positive reviews. Philip French described the film as "not exactly innovative" and compared it to "earnestly worthy prewar Warner Brothers cinebiographies". Overall he called it "a very decent contribution to the present bicentennial celebrations of the parliamentary bill that outlawed the slave trade in the British empire". Wally Hammond writing for Time Out singled out Benedict Cumberbatch's performance for praise saying his performance "quietly upstaged" the fine performance of Gruffudd. The Guardian gave it a C− for the entertainment value and an A− for its historical accuracy.

Review aggregation website Rotten Tomatoes gives the film a score of 67% based on review from 126 critics, with an average rating of 6.50/10. According to the website, the film is "your quintessential historical biopic: stately, noble, and with plenty of electrifying performances".  Metacritic gives the film a 65 out of 100, based on reviews from 29 critics, indicating "generally favorable reviews".

Awards and nominations

See also
 List of films featuring slavery

References

External links

 
 
 
 
 
 

Fiction set in 1782
Fiction set in 1797
2006 films
2006 biographical drama films
2000s historical drama films
Abolitionism in the United Kingdom
British biographical drama films
British historical drama films
Films shot at Elstree Film Studios
2000s English-language films
English-language Scottish films
Films scored by David Arnold
Films about Christianity
Films about evangelicalism
Films about politicians
Films about race and ethnicity
Films about slavery
Films directed by Michael Apted
Films set in 1782
Films set in 1797
Films set in 1807
Films set in England
Films set in London
2000s political drama films
Films with screenplays by Steven Knight
African slave trade
Slavery in the British Empire
Roadside Attractions films
Cultural depictions of William Pitt the Younger
2006 drama films
British slave trade
2000s British films